Catocala neonympha is a moth in the family Erebidae first described by Arthur Gardiner Butler in 1877. It is found in south-western Russia, Ukraine, Kazakhstan, eastern Turkey, Iraq, Armenia, Kurdistan, Afghanistan, the Altai Mountains and southern Siberia.

Adults have been recorded on wing in August.

The larvae feed on Glycyrrhiza glabra (licorice) and possibly Quercus (oak) species. Larvae can be found from May to July.

Subspecies
Catocala neonympha neonympha
Catocala neonympha osthelderensis Hacker, 1990
Catocala neonympha variegata (Warren, 1913)

References

neonympha
Moths described in 1877
Moths of Asia